The Carry-I was a book-size workstation produced by Flytech Technology of Taiwan, circa 1991. It was available in multiple configurations; ranging from Intel 8088 based XT-compatible models, to a high end model powered by a 16 MHz 386SX and featuring an 80MB hard drive. It was also available as a diskless node powered by either an 8088 or an 80286. The system was bundled with DR DOS 5.0.

In Australia the system was sold by the company Hypec Technology Pty. Ltd.

References

External links
Period marketing literature:
FT-8100 and FT-8200 Series (Carry-I 8088 and 80286)

Carry-I 9000 series
Rétro Scan: Flytech Carry-I (1991)
Vintage company video about the Carry-I computer family: 
Video presentation (in Polish) of Carry-I 8088, booting to DOS 3.3 and running Pac-Girl (1:52:02 - 1:56:21): 

Diskless workstations